Zepton Greaves (born 10 December 1942) is a Vincentian cricketer. He played in two first-class matches for the Windward Islands in 1972/73.

See also
 List of Windward Islands first-class cricketers

References

External links
 

1942 births
Living people
Saint Vincent and the Grenadines cricketers
Windward Islands cricketers